Crossea miranda is a species of small sea snail or micromollusc, a marine gastropod mollusc in the family Conradiidae.

Description
The height of the white shell varies between 3 mm and 6 mm. It contains 3-4 whorls that increase rapidly in size. They are very convex and spirally striate. They contain thin, low, longitudinal, not synchronized varices; this makes it unusual. The aperture is produced below.

Distribution
This marine species occurs off New Zealand and Japan.

References

On some new genera of mollusca from the Seas of Japan. The Annals and Magazine of natural History 15: 322-324, sér. 3° série

External links
 To World Register of Marine Species
 

miranda
Gastropods described in 1865